Filippo Cavazzuti (27 April 1942 – 11 July 2021) was an Italian politician who served as a Senator.

References

1942 births
2021 deaths
Italian politicians
Senators of Legislature IX of Italy
Senators of Legislature X of Italy
Senators of Legislature XI of Italy
Senators of Legislature XII of Italy
Italian Communist Party politicians
Democratic Party of the Left politicians
University of Bologna alumni
People from Modena
Knights Grand Cross of the Order of Merit of the Italian Republic